The Oregon State Beavers women's basketball team is the official women's basketball team of Oregon State University in Corvallis, Oregon. They are one of ten varsity women's sports at OSU. They are a member of the Pac-12 Conference and the National Collegiate Athletic Association (NCAA). The team's home venue is Gill Coliseum and their official colors are orange and black.  The Beavers have made 12 appearances in NCAA Tournaments, most recently in 2021. The current head coach is Scott Rueck, assisted by Jonas Chatterton, Brian Holsinger, and Katie Faulker.

Program history

Origins

A women's basketball team was established at Oregon Agricultural College during the academic year of 1897–98, with one game played in the spring of 1898 by the school squad in response to a challenge offered by the team of the Chemawa Indian Institute of Salem. The match, played April 29 in Salem at the Willamette University gym, was won by OAC by a score of 13 to 11. The OAC team included Inez Fuller, Fanny Getty, Dora Hodgin, Blanche Holden, Bessie Smith, and Leona "Nonie" Smith.

The OAC women's basketball team was more formally organized by the 1899–1900 academic year, with Bessie Smith elected team president as well as a slate of officers, including a vice-president, secretary, and treasurer.<ref name=Smith>[https://www.newspapers.com/clip/34225359/oac_aggie_women_elect_basketball_team/ "Union Gazette [Corvallis], vol. 36, no. 43 (Oct. 20, 1899), p. 3.</ref> Scheduling was handled by the team manager, Mr. J.H. Gallagher.

The 1899-1900 team was a powerhouse, annihilating neighboring Albany College by a score of 47–2 in one January 1900 game played at the OAC armory. A local paper noted of the game, "So perfect and rapid was the playing of the ladies of the OAC, that the visitors were bewildered, and gazed open-mouthed at the skill of their opponents." For their part, the Albany Herald attributed the drubbing to a very slippery floor, a larger-than-accustomed gymnasium, and a smaller-than-usual ball — in addition to the "long and hard practice of the OAC girls."

It would not be until the 1901–02 season that a formal men's basketball program would be established at the school. The women's basketball program continued to set the pace for the school, with the team going unbeaten into March and generating a $50 gate for the athletic fund for a single game against Chemawa. "The example they set OAC young men in athletics is worthy of emulation," the Corvallis Times'' opined.

From the 1940s through the 1970s, women's basketball existed as a club sport under Oregon State's Women's Recreation Association (WRA).

Current program

The contemporary OSU women's basketball program was launched in 1976. The team posted a 5–20 record in its inaugural 1976–77 season. By the end of the 2018–19 season, the team's overall record was 695–576.

The Beavers won three consecutive Pac-12 titles from 2015 to 2017 and are currently on a streak of four consecutive Sweet Sixteen appearances beginning in 2016.

Coaching staff 

Current head coach Scott Rueck is under contract through the 2026–2027 season after signing a four-year extension on October 17, 2017. He has been head coach since 2010, previously serving as head coach at George Fox University for 14 years. Rueck is a graduate of Oregon State, earning a bachelor's degree in exercise and sports science from the university in 1991 and a master's degree in physical education in 1992.

Notable alumni 

Mikayla Pivec - 2019 third-round draft selection of the Atlanta Dream
Marie Gulich - 2018 first-round draft selection of the Phoenix Mercury
Ruth Hamblin - 2016 second round by the Dallas Wings
 Carol Menken — 1984 Olympics gold medalist, member Oregon Sports Hall of Fame
Jamie Weisner - 2016 second round by the Connecticut Sun
Sydney Weise - 2017 first-round draft selection of the Los Angeles Sparks

Awards 
Since 2014:

 Pac-12 John R. Wooden Coach of the Year - Scott Rueck (2017)
 Pac-12 Player of the Year - Jamie Weisner (2016), Ruth Hamblin (2015)
 Pac-12 Scholar Athlete of the Year - Mikayla Pivec (2020), Sydney Wiese (2017), Ruth Hamblin (2016)
 Pac-12 Defensive Players of the Year -  Marie Gulich (2018), Gabriella Hanson (2017), Ruth Hamblin (2015, 2016),
 Inaugural Sixth Player of the Year - Aleah Goodman (2018)
 8 - First team All Pac-12
 22 -  All Pac-12
 4 - Pac-12 All Academic First Team
 20 - Pac-12 All Academic Team

Facilities 
Prior to the construction of Gill Coliseum in 1950, the club version of the women's team played their games in the Women's Building on campus.

Opened in 2013 the OSU Basketball Center is a shared practice facility for both the men's and women's basketball teams. Amenities include an indoor basketball court, locker rooms, training and medical areas, and service and mechanical spaces. Additionally the space contains offices for coaches and other team personnel along with the OSU basketball hall of fame honoring achievements of both past and present. The facility is 34,500 square feet and cost $15 million to complete.

NCAA tournament results

References

External links
 
 

 
1976 establishments in Oregon